Carla Kristen Esparza (born October 10, 1987) is an American professional mixed martial artist who competes in the Strawweight division of the Ultimate Fighting Championship (UFC), in which she is a former two-time UFC Women's Strawweight Champion. Esparza was the first UFC Strawweight Champion, the first Invicta FC Strawweight Champion, and was generally considered the best Strawweight fighter in the world during both initial title reigns. She first earned the UFC championship by winning a 16-woman tournament that was televised on the reality series The Ultimate Fighter. She also competed in Bellator MMA's first women's tournament. As of November 15, 2022, she is #1 in the UFC women's strawweight rankings, and as of March 7, 2023, she is ranked #7 in the UFC women's pound-for-pound rankings.

Amateur and collegiate wrestling
Carla Esparza's foray into mixed martial arts (MMA) began when she started wrestling for the varsity team during her junior year at Redondo Union High School in Redondo Beach, California. After winning multiple local and national high-school wrestling tournaments, Esparza was awarded a scholarship to Menlo College, a NAIA Division  school in northern California, to wrestle under coach and former two-time Olympian Lee Allen.

In 2008 and 2009, Esparza was a women's wrestling All-American with the Menlo Oaks.

While in college, Esparza started training in Brazilian Jiu-Jitsu at the Gracie Academy in Torrance under Rener, Ryron, and Ralek Gracie. She then expanded her mixed martial arts repertoire when she began training at Team Oyama during the summer of her junior year of college.

Mixed martial arts career

Bellator
In August 2010, only six months after her pro debut and with just three professional MMA fights, Esparza was called in by Bellator MMA as a last-minute replacement for Angela Magaña, who was forced to withdraw from her upcoming fight due to a foot injury. Esparza was inserted in the bracket of the Bellator Season 3 115 lb women's tournament at Bellator 24. On just three days' notice, Esparza's opponent in the quarterfinal round was the undefeated and then #1 pound-for-pound female MMA fighter in the world, Megumi Fujii. Esparza lost the fight to the heavily favored Fujii via second-round armbar submission.

In June 2011, Esparza returned to the Bellator cage and faced fellow Season 3 tournament challenger Jessica Aguilar at Bellator 46. After a three-round back and forth battle, Aguilar defeated Esparza via split decision.

XFC and MEZ Sports
On December 2, 2011, Esparza made her XFC debut against Felice Herrig at XFC 15: Tribute in Tampa, Florida. She defeated Herrig via unanimous decision.

Three months later, Esparza was scheduled to face Angela Magana at Pandemonium VI for the MEZ Sports women's flyweight title. Unfortunately, Magana was involved in a car accident on the day of the fight while in transit to the Riverside Convention Center, where the event was being staged. Magana re-broke her back in the collision and was unable to compete in the fight.

Invicta FC
In May 2012, it was announced that Esparza had signed with the upstart all-female Invicta Fighting Championships promotion.

On July 28, 2012, Esparza made her Invicta debut at the promotion's second event, entitled Invicta FC 2: Baszler vs. McMann, and faced Sarah Schneider on the preliminary card. Esparza won the fight via TKO (punches) at 4:28 of round two.

Esparza returned to Invicta to face Lynn Alvarez at Invicta FC 3: Penne vs. Sugiyama on October 6, 2012. She defeated Alvarez via TKO (punches) at 2:53 of round one.

Strawweight Championship
Esparza was expected to face Ayaka Hamasaki for the Invicta FC Strawweight Championship at Invicta FC 4: Esparza vs. Hyatt on January 5, 2013. However, Hamasaki withdrew from the fight in order to defend her Jewels Lightweight title in Japan. Esparza was then set to face Brazilian Jiu-Jitsu black belt Cláudia Gadelha in the Invicta FC 4 main event, but Gadelha broke her nose in training and was forced to withdraw.

Esparza ultimately faced Bec Hyatt for the Invicta FC Strawweight Championship. Esparza won the fight via unanimous decision to become the first Invicta FC Strawweight Champion.

Esparza agreed to defend her title against Ayaka Hamasaki at Invicta FC 6: Coenen vs. Cyborg on July 13, 2013. However, on June 4 she withdrew from the fight due to a knee injury.

On December 7, 2013, Esparza was set to defend her strawweight title against Cláudia Gadelha at Invicta FC 7. However, on the day of the event, Gadelha was taken to the hospital due to a bacterial infection and the fight was canceled. Esparza vacated the title on December 11, 2013 to compete on The Ultimate Fighter.

The Ultimate Fighter
On December 11, 2013, it was announced that Esparza was signed by the Ultimate Fighting Championship (UFC) along with 10 other strawweight fighters to compete on season 20 of The Ultimate Fighter, which would crown the first ever UFC Strawweight Champion.

Esparza was the top seed in the tournament. She faced Angela Hill in the preliminary round and won via submission in the first round. In the quarterfinal round, she faced Tecia Torres and won the fight via majority decision. She then faced teammate Jessica Penne in the semifinal, and won by unanimous decision.

Ultimate Fighting Championship
By winning the tournament on The Ultimate Fighter, Esparza advanced to the final on December 12, 2014, against Rose Namajunas.

Strawweight Champion

After dominating much of the fight with her grappling and ground strikes, Esparza defeated Namajunas via rear-naked choke in the third round to become the inaugural UFC Strawweight Champion. The result also earned Esparza a Performance of the Night bonus.

Kevin Iole of Yahoo Sports noted, "Namajunas tapped at 1:26 of the third round, but the fight was over long before that. Esparza was too strong, too smart and simply too good for the far less experienced Namajunas." He went on to state that "Esparza dominated her three fights on the reality show and was no less dominant on Saturday. There is clearly a gap between Esparza and the next level of challengers". Following the fight, Brad Walker of MMATorch declared, "Esparza is the best fighter in her division in the world, not just in the UFC."

In her first title defense, Esparza faced kickboxer Joanna Jędrzejczyk on March 14, 2015, at UFC 185. Prior to the fight, Jędrzejczyk stated, "I have lots of respect for her." She also noted, "I know she's not going to give up easy, so it's going to be a tough fight for me and for her." Throughout the bout, Esparza was out-struck while standing and unable to keep Jędrzejczyk on the mat. Jędrzejczyk won via TKO in the second round. In an interview afterward, Esparza noted, "She had great takedown defense, obviously. I feel like I wasn't really setting it up, but that's on me." She went on to state, "There's never any excuses. I fought my fight and I lost tonight. She did a great job."

Esparza underwent shoulder surgery in mid-2015 and subsequently was out of action for the rest of the year.

Rebound
Esparza returned at UFC 197 on April 23, 2016, defeating Juliana Lima via unanimous decision. Esparza, who stepped in for Jessica Aguilar, noted, "I took this fight semi-last minute, and I kind of wanted it that way too. Even though I wasn't in the best shape I wanted to be, I just kind of wanted to avoid the stress of a long camp." She also stated, "It's a huge relief off my shoulders to go out there and get my hand raised."

Esparza next faced Randa Markos on February 19, 2017 at UFC Fight Night: Lewis vs. Browne. She lost the fight via controversial split decision. 19 of 23 media outlets scored the fight 29-28 for Esparza.

Esparza faced Maryna Moroz on June 25, 2017 at UFC Fight Night 112. She won the fight via unanimous decision.

Esparza faced Cynthia Calvillo on December 30, 2017 at UFC 219. She won the fight via unanimous decision.

Esparza faced Cláudia Gadelha on June 9, 2018 at UFC 225. She lost the fight via split decision.

Esparza faced Tatiana Suarez on September 8, 2018 at UFC 228. Esparza lost the fight via TKO in the third round.

Esparza was scheduled to face Lívia Renata Souza on April 27, 2019 at UFC Fight Night: Jacaré vs. Hermansson. However, it was reported that Souza pulled out of the bout, citing ankle injury and was replaced by promotional newcomer Virna Jandiroba. Esparza won the fight via unanimous decision.

Esparza faced Alexa Grasso on September 21, 2019 at UFC Fight Night 159. She won the fight via majority decision. This fight earned her the Fight of the Night award, the first of her UFC career.

Esparza was scheduled to face Michelle Waterson on April 11, 2020 at UFC Fight Night: Overeem vs. Harris. Due to the COVID-19 pandemic, the event was eventually postponed and the bout eventually took place on May 9, 2020 at UFC 249. She won the fight via split decision.

On June 3, 2020, Esparza's manager announced that she had signed a new four-fight deal with the UFC.

Esparza was expected to face Marina Rodriguez on July 15, 2020 at UFC Fight Night 172. However the bout was cancelled after one of Rodriguez's cornermen tested positive for COVID-19. The pair eventually fought at UFC on ESPN 14 on July 26, 2020. Esparza won the fight via split decision.

Esparza was expected to face Amanda Ribas on December 12, 2020 at UFC 256.  However on October 9, it was announced that Esparza was pulled due to undisclosed reasons.

Esparza faced Yan Xiaonan on May 22, 2021 at UFC Fight Night 188. She won the bout via TKO after dominating Yan on the ground throughout the bout. This win earned her the Performance of the Night award.

Second championship reign 
Esparza faced Rose Namajunas in a rematch for the UFC Women's Strawweight Championship on May 7, 2022 at UFC 274. Esparza won a largely uneventful fight by split decision to claim the UFC Women's Strawweight Championship for a second time. With the victory, Esparza set a record for longest time between UFC title reigns by any fighter, male or female, at 2,612 days.

In her first defense, Esparza faced Zhang Weili on November 12, 2022, at UFC 281. She lost the bout and the belt by the way of a rear-naked choke submission in the second round.

Grappling 
Esparza stepped up on short notice to replace Rose Namajunas in a grappling match against Danielle Kelly at Fury Pro Grappling 3 on December 30, 2021. After a tough match, Esparza slammed Kelly from full guard and the resulting clash of heads opened up a cut above Esparza's eyebrow. The doctors attending called the match off and the victory was awarded to Kelly as a result of the injury.

Fighting style
Esparza is known for powerful wrestling and Brazilian Jiu-jitsu. On the mat, she often mounts an opponent and controls her with strikes while seeking submissions. While standing, she typically clinches and attacks with punches, knees and elbows.

Championships and accomplishments
Ultimate Fighting Championship
UFC Women's Strawweight Championship (Two times; First)
Tied (Joanna Jedrzejczyk) for most wins in the UFC Women's Strawweight division history (10)
Most takedowns landed in the UFC Women's Strawweight division history (44)
Longest time between title reigns in UFC history (2,612 days)
Fight of the Night (One time) 
Performance of the Night (Two times)   
The Ultimate Fighter 20 Tournament Winner
Most split decision wins in the UFC Women's Strawweight division history (3)
Invicta FC
Invicta FC Strawweight Championship (One time; First)
Combat Press
2014 Female Fighter of the Year
MMAWeekly.com
2014 Female Fighter of the Year

Submission grappling
Pan-American Championship
2013 Pan-American Jiu-Jitsu Championship Female Blue Belt Silver Medalist

Personal life 
Esparza is of Mexican, Ecuadorian and Irish descent. She married her husband Matthew Lomeli in May 2022.

Mixed martial arts record

|-
|Loss
|align=center|19–7
|Zhang Weili
|Submission (rear-naked choke)
|UFC 281
| 
|align=center|2
|align=center|1:05
|New York City, New York, United States
|
|-
|Win
|align=center|19–6
|Rose Namajunas
|Decision (split)
|UFC 274
|
|align=center|5
|align=center|5:00
|Phoenix, Arizona, United States
|
|-
|Win
|align=center|18–6
|Yan Xiaonan
|TKO (punches)
|UFC Fight Night: Font vs. Garbrandt 
|
|align=center|2
|align=center|2:58
|Las Vegas, Nevada, United States
| 
|-
|Win
|align=center|17–6
|Marina Rodriguez
|Decision (split)
|UFC on ESPN: Whittaker vs. Till 
|
|align=center|3
|align=center|5:00
|Abu Dhabi, United Arab Emirates
|
|-
|Win
|align=center|16–6
|Michelle Waterson
|Decision (split)
|UFC 249
|
|align=center|3
|align=center|5:00
|Jacksonville, Florida, United States
|
|-
|Win
|align=center|15–6
|Alexa Grasso
|Decision (majority)
|UFC Fight Night: Rodríguez vs. Stephens 
|
|align=center|3
|align=center|5:00
|Mexico City, Mexico
|
|-
|Win
|align=center|14–6
|Virna Jandiroba
|Decision (unanimous)
|UFC Fight Night: Jacaré vs. Hermansson 
|
|align=center|3
|align=center|5:00
|Sunrise, Florida, United States
|
|-
|Loss
|align=center|13–6
|Tatiana Suarez
|TKO (punches and elbows)
|UFC 228 
|
|align=center|3
|align=center|4:33
|Dallas, Texas, United States
|
|-
|Loss
|align=center|13–5
|Cláudia Gadelha
|Decision (split)
|UFC 225 
|
|align=center|3
|align=center|5:00
|Chicago, Illinois, United States
|
|-
|Win
|align=center|13–4
|Cynthia Calvillo
|Decision (unanimous)
|UFC 219
|
|align=center|3
|align=center|5:00
|Las Vegas, Nevada, United States
|
|-
|Win
|align=center|12–4
|Maryna Moroz
|Decision (unanimous)
|UFC Fight Night: Chiesa vs. Lee
|
|align=center|3
|align=center|5:00
|Oklahoma City, Oklahoma, United States
|
|-
|Loss
|align=center|11–4
|Randa Markos
|Decision (split)
|UFC Fight Night: Lewis vs. Browne
|
|align=center|3
|align=center|5:00
|Halifax, Nova Scotia, Canada
|
|-
|Win
|align="center"|11–3
|Juliana Lima
|Decision (unanimous)
|UFC 197
|
|align="center"|3
|align="center"|5:00
|Las Vegas, Nevada, United States
| 
|-
|Loss
|align="center"|10–3
|Joanna Jędrzejczyk
|TKO (punches)
|UFC 185
|
|align=center|2
|align=center|4:17
|Dallas, Texas, United States
|
|-
| Win
|align="center" | 10–2
| Rose Namajunas
| Submission (rear-naked choke)
| The Ultimate Fighter: A Champion Will Be Crowned Finale
| 
|align="center" | 3
|align="center" | 1:26
| Las Vegas, Nevada, United States
| 
|-
| Win
|align="center" | 9–2
|  Bec Rawlings
| Decision (unanimous)
| Invicta FC 4: Esparza vs. Hyatt
| 
|align="center" | 5
|align="center" | 5:00
| Kansas City, Kansas, United States
| 
|-
| Win
|align="center" | 8–2
|  Lynn Alvarez
| TKO (punches)
| Invicta FC 3: Penne vs. Sugiyama
| 
|align="center" | 1
|align="center" | 2:53
| Kansas City, Kansas, United States
| 
|-
| Win
|align="center" | 7–2
|  Sarah Schneider
| TKO (punches)
| Invicta FC 2: Baszler vs. McMann
| 
|align="center" | 2
|align="center" | 4:28
| Kansas City, Kansas, United States
| 
|-
| Win
|align="center" | 6–2
|  Felice Herrig
| Decision (unanimous)
| XFC 15: Tribute
| 
|align="center" | 3
|align="center" | 5:00
| Tampa, Florida, United States
| 
|-
| Loss
|align="center" | 5–2
|  Jessica Aguilar
| Decision (split)
| Bellator 46
| 
|align="center" | 3
|align="center" | 5:00
| Hollywood, Florida, United States
| 
|-
| Win
|align="center" | 5–1
|  Yadira Anzaldua
| Submission (rear-naked choke)
| ECSC: Friday Night Fights 3
| 
|align="center" | 1
|align="center" | 0:53
| Clovis, New Mexico, United States
| 
|-
| Win
|align="center" | 4–1
| Nina Ansaroff
| Decision (split)
| Crowbar MMA: Winter Brawl
| 
|align="center" | 3
|align="center" | 5:00
| |Grand Forks, North Dakota, United States
| 
|-
| Loss
|align="center" | 3–1
|  Megumi Fujii
| Submission (armbar)
| Bellator 24
| 
|align="center" | 2
|align="center" | 0:57
| Hollywood, Florida, United States
| 
|-
| Win
|align="center" | 3–0
|  Lacey Schuckman
| Submission (rear-naked choke)
| NMEF - Ladies Night: Clash of the Titans 8
| 
|align="center" | 2
|align="center" | 2:37
| Castle Rock, Colorado, United States
| 
|-
| Win
|align="center" | 2–0
|  Karina Hallinan
| Submission (rear-naked choke)
| Long Beach Fight Night 8
| 
|align="center" | 2
|align="center" | 2:16
| Long Beach, California, United States
| 
|-
| Win
|align="center" | 1–0
|  Cassie Trost
| TKO (punches)
| Respect in the Cage 3
| 
|align="center" | 1
|align="center" | 0:48
| Pomona, California, United States
| 

|-
|Win
|align=center|3–0
| Jessica Penne
| Decision (unanimous)
| rowspan=3|The Ultimate Fighter: A Champion Will Be Crowned
| (airdate)
|align=center|3
|align=center|5:00
|rowspan=3|Las Vegas, Nevada, United States
|
|-
|Win
|align=center|2–0
| Tecia Torres
| Decision (majority)
| (airdate)
|align=center|2
|align=center|5:00
|
|-
|Win
|align=center|1–0
| Angela Hill
| Submission (rear-naked choke)
| (airdate)
|align=center|1
|align=center|3:42
|

See also
 List of current UFC fighters
 List of female mixed martial artists

References

External links
 
 
 Carla Esparza at Invicta FC
 Carla Esparza Awakening Profile

1987 births
Sportspeople from Torrance, California
American female mixed martial artists
Mixed martial artists from California
American mixed martial artists of Mexican descent
Strawweight mixed martial artists
Mixed martial artists utilizing collegiate wrestling
Mixed martial artists utilizing Brazilian jiu-jitsu
Living people
Menlo College alumni
American people of Irish descent
American people of Ecuadorian descent
Sportspeople of Ecuadorian descent
Ultimate Fighting Championship champions
Ultimate Fighting Championship female fighters
American female sport wrestlers
Amateur wrestlers
American practitioners of Brazilian jiu-jitsu
Female Brazilian jiu-jitsu practitioners
21st-century American women